Vietnam first competed in the Olympic Games in 1952 as the State of Vietnam. After the Partition of Vietnam in 1954, only the Republic of Vietnam competed in the Games, sending athletes to every Summer Olympics between 1956 and 1972.

Since the reunification of Vietnam in 1976, they have competed as the Socialist Republic of Vietnam, attending every Olympics from 1980 onwards with the exception of 1984. The present Vietnam Olympic Committee was formed in 1976 and recognized by the International Olympic Committee (IOC) in 1979. Vietnam has never competed in the Winter Olympics.

Vietnam won its first medal at the 2000 Games in Sydney, when Trần Hiếu Ngân took home a silver in Taekwondo in the Women's -75 kg category. Vietnam won its first gold medal at the 2016 Games in Rio de Janeiro, when shooter Hoàng Xuân Vinh was victorious in the Men's 10m air pistol event.  

With a lack of investment into competing in the Olympics, Vietnam has only sent an average of around 12 athletes per game up until 2020 Tokyo. Stereotypes such as the Olympics and other sporting events being associated with heavy doping and cheating has made the event less prestigious for the Vietnamese.

Medal tables

Medals by Summer Games

Medals by sport

List of medalists

See also
 List of flag bearers for Vietnam at the Olympics
 Vietnam at the Paralympics

References

External links